A snowrider is a winter sports enthusiast.

Snowriders may refer to:
 Skiers
 Sledders
 Snowboarders